Henry Mann (1905–2000) was a mathematician.

Henry Mann is also the name of:

Henry F. Mann, inventor and blacksmith
Harry Mann (Henry Willoughby Mann, 1873–1952), Australian police officer and politician
Henry James Montague (Henry James Mann, 1844–1878), American actor

See also
Henry Manne (1928–2015), American writer and academic
Henry Man (disambiguation)